Huo Che or rocket carts are several types of Chinese multiple rocket launcher developed for firing multiple fire arrows. The name Huo Che first appears in Feng Tian Jing Nan Ji, a historical text covering the Jingnan War (1399 – 1402) of Ming dynasty.

History 

The dating of the invention of the first rocket, otherwise known as the gunpowder propelled fire arrow, is disputed. The History of Song attributes the invention to two different people at different times, Feng Zhisheng in 969 and Tang Fu in 1000. However Joseph Needham argues that rockets could not have existed before the 12th century, since the gunpowder formulas listed in the Wujing Zongyao are not suitable as rocket propellant.

A "flying fire-lance" that had re-usable barrels was also mentioned to have been used by the Jin dynasty (1115–1234). Rockets are recorded to have been used by the Song navy in a military exercise dated to 1245. Internal-combustion rocket propulsion is mentioned in a reference to 1264, recording that the 'ground-rat,' a type of firework, had  frightened the Empress-Mother Gongsheng at a feast held in her honor by her son the Emperor Lizong.

Subsequently, rockets are included in the military treatise Huolongjing, also known as the Fire Drake Manual, written by the Chinese artillery officer Jiao Yu in the mid-14th century. This text mentions the first known multistage rocket, the 'fire-dragon issuing from the water' (huo long chu shui), thought to have been used by the Chinese navy.

Rocket launchers known as "nest of bees" were ordered by the Ming army in 1380. In 1400, the Ming loyalist Li Jinglong used rocket launchers against the army of Zhu Di (Yongle Emperor).

The American historian Frank H. Winter proposed in The Proceedings of the Twentieth and Twenty-First History Symposia of the International Academy of Astronautics that southern China and the Laotian community rocket festivals might have been key in the subsequent spread of rocketry in the Orient.

As multiple rocket launchers, rocket carts were used in the Ming dynasty in the Jingnan War (1399 – 1402) and were carried on the ships of Zheng He (1371 – 1433) during his voyages to India and Africa. Huo Ches were primarily used in a defensive manner for close-range infantry support.

Variants

Huo Che 
Fire cart: A fire arrow engine deployed in Jingnan War, recorded in Feng Tian Jing Nan Ji.

Jiahuo zhanche 
Wheelbarrow fire engine: Multiple rocket launcher supported by a wheelbarrow cart, recorded in Wubei Zhi. The frame of the cart can be attached to variable sizes of rocket pods, including Chang She Po Di Jian with 30 rockets per pod, and Bai Hu Qi Ben Jian with 100 rockets per pod.

Huojianche 
Huojianche: It's a type of multiple rocket launcher supported by a two-wheeled cart, recorded in Si Zhen San Guan Zhi.

Gallery

References

Bibliography
 
 
 
 .

See also 
 Hwacha
 Fire arrow
 Ribauldequin
 Huolongjing
 Wubei Zhi

External links

Artillery of China
Chinese inventions
Early firearms
Early rocketry
Rocket artillery
Salvo weapons